MLB 2001 is a Major League Baseball video game for the PlayStation. The color commentary for the game is from Dave Campbell and the play by play announcer is Vin Scully. Chipper Jones of the Atlanta Braves was featured on the cover.

It was preceded by MLB 2000 and succeeded by MLB 2002.

Reception

The game received "favorable" reviews according to the review aggregation website GameRankings.

References

External links
 
 

2000 video games
Major League Baseball video games
North America-exclusive video games
PlayStation (console) games
PlayStation (console)-only games
Video games developed in the United States
Video games set in 2001